Clara Tabody (born Klára Lívia Thurmayer) (1915–1986) was a Hungarian actress, singer and dancer. She starred in both the stage version of the operetta Mask in Blue and its 1943 film adaptation.

She worked for many years in Germany where at one point the studio Tobis Film briefly tried to build her up as a rival to her fellow Hungarian Marika Rökk, then working for UFA. After marrying an Italian she principally settled in that country.

Her sister Ida Turay was also an actress, known for her starring roles in Hungarian films.

Selected filmography
 The Carnival Is Here Again (1937)
 The Hussar Captain (1940)
 Bravo Acrobat! (1943)
 Mask in Blue (1943)

References

Bibliography
 Noack, Frank. Veit Harlan: The Life and Work of a Nazi Filmmaker. University Press of Kentucky, 2016.

External links

1915 births
1986 deaths
Actresses from Budapest
Hungarian expatriates in Germany
Hungarian emigrants to Italy
Hungarian film actresses
20th-century Hungarian women singers